The 2018 OFC Women's Nations Cup qualification tournament was a football competition that took place from 24 to 30 August 2018 in Lautoka, Fiji to determine the final women's national team which joined the seven automatically qualified teams in the 2018 OFC Women's Nations Cup final tournament in New Caledonia.

Teams
On 31 October 2017, the OFC announced its executive's decision on the teams to compete in the tournament. For the first time, the OFC Women's Nations Cup is a compulsory tournament, so all 11 OFC member national teams entered the tournament. The four lowest-ranked teams, based on previous regional performances of all women's national teams, entered the qualification tournament while the remaining teams were given a bye to the final tournament.

Format
The four lowest-ranked teams based on previous regional performances of all women’s national teams (American Samoa, Solomon Islands, Vanuatu, and Fiji) entered the qualification tournament, which was played in a single round-robin format in Fiji.

The winner advanced to the 2018 OFC Women's Nations Cup, held from 18 November to 1 December 2018 in New Caledonia, joining the other seven teams which received a bye into the group stage. The Nations Cup serves as the Oceanian qualifiers to the 2019 FIFA Women's World Cup, with the champions qualifying for the final tournament in France, as well as the 2020 Summer Olympics women's football tournament in Japan, as long as they are a member of the International Olympic Committee (IOC).

Each team can name a maximum of 20 players.

Tiebreakers
The ranking of teams is determined as follows:

 Points obtained in all qualifying matches;
 Goal difference in all qualifying matches;
 Number of goals scored in all qualifying matches;
 Points obtained in the matches played between the teams in question;
 Goal difference in the matches played between the teams in question;
 Number of goals scored in the matches played between the teams in question;
 Fair play points in all qualifying matches (only one deduction can be applied to a player in a single match): 
 Coin toss or drawing of lots.

Draw
The draw for the qualification tournament was held on 21 March 2018 at the OFC Headquarters in Auckland, New Zealand. The hosts Fiji were assigned to position 1 and were exempted from the draw, while the remaining teams were drawn into the other positions without any seeding in order to determine the match schedule.

The draw for the match schedule resulted in the following positions:

Note: Bolded team qualified for the 2018 OFC Women's Nations Cup.

Venue
The qualification tournament was held at Churchill Park in Lautoka, Fiji. The tournament was originally scheduled to be held in Pago Pago, American Samoa from 27 August to 4 September 2018, but in March 2018 the venue was changed to Fiji. The qualification tournament in Fiji was originally scheduled to take place from 25–31 August 2018, but was later adjusted to 24–30 August.

Schedule
The match schedule was revealed on 6 July 2018. The schedule of qualification is as follows:

Standings

Matches
All times are local, FJT (UTC+12).

Goalscorers

Qualified teams
The following eight teams qualified for the final tournament.

References

External links
OFC Women's Nations Cup, oceaniafootball.com
News > 2018 OFC Women's Nations Cup, oceaniafootball.com

Qualification
International association football competitions hosted by Fiji
August 2018 sports events in Oceania